Phialocephala is a genus of fungi in the family Mollisiaceae. It has a worldwide distribution.
It contains 39 accepted species and numerous undescribed taxa.

Species
This section contains only accepted species.

 Phialocephala amethystea 
 Phialocephala aylmerensis 
 Phialocephala bamuru 
 Phialocephala botulispora 
 Phialocephala canadensis 
 Phialocephala catenospora 
 Phialocephala cladophialophoroides 
 Phialocephala compacta 
 Phialocephala dimorphospora 
 Phialocephala europaea 
 Phialocephala fluminis 
 Phialocephala fortinii 
 Phialocephala fusca 
 Phialocephala gabalongii 
 Phialocephala glacialis 
 Phialocephala helvetica 
 Phialocephala hiberna 
 Phialocephala humicola 
 Phialocephala lagerbergii 
 Phialocephala letzii 
 Phialocephala mallochii 
 Phialocephala mexicana 
 Phialocephala nodosa 
 Phialocephala oblonga 
 Phialocephala piceae 
 Phialocephala queenslandica 
 Phialocephala repens 
 Phialocephala scopiformis 
 Phialocephala sphaeroides 
 Phialocephala subalpina 
 Phialocephala trigonospora 
 Phialocephala turicensis 
 Phialocephala uotiloensis 
 Phialocephala urceolata 
 Phialocephala vermiculata 
 Phialocephala victorinii 
 Phialocephala virens 
 Phialocephala vittalensis 
 Phialocephala xalapensis

References

Helotiales genera
Helotiales